Antani Ivanov (born 17 July 1999) is a Bulgarian swimmer. He competed in the men's 50 metre butterfly, men's 100 metre butterfly and men's 200 metre butterfly events at the 2017 World Aquatics Championships. He finished 38th in the 50 metre butterfly, 41st in the 100 metre butterfly and 8th in the 200 metre butterfly, setting a national record of 1:55.55 in the heats. His final in the 200 metre was the first for a Bulgarian swimmer since Mihail Alexandrov's 6th place at the 2007 World Aquatics Championships men's 100 metre breaststroke.

He has qualified to represent Bulgaria at the 2020 Summer Olympics in the men's 200 metre butterfly event.

References

External links
 

1999 births
Living people
Bulgarian male swimmers
Male butterfly swimmers
Swimmers at the 2020 Summer Olympics
Olympic swimmers of Bulgaria
Virginia Tech Hokies men's swimmers
People from Veliko Tarnovo
Sportspeople from Veliko Tarnovo Province
20th-century Bulgarian people
21st-century Bulgarian people